Hacker-Pschorr is a brewery in Munich, formed in 1972 out of the merger of two breweries, Hacker and Pschorr. Hacker was founded in 1417, nearly a century before the enactment of the Reinheitsgebot beer purity law of 1516.

As one of six breweries located within Munich's city limits, its beers are among those served at Oktoberfest.

History

In the late 18th century, Joseph Pschorr (1770-1841) bought the Hacker brewery from his father-in-law Peter-Paul Hacker. He subsequently founded a separate brewery under his own name.  

In  the early 19th century, Joseph Pschorr and Maria Theresia Hacker established Hacker-Pschorr as one of the biggest breweries in Munich. In 1813, they built the „Hacker-Keller“ in Landsbergerstraße in Munich, the biggest storage cellar in Germany. The huge brewing and storage cellar is 4,000 square meters big and has a storage area of over 35,000 hectoliters. When Joseph Pschorr died, his two sons Georg Pschorr and Matthias Pschorr Sr. divided his estate by each assuming one of the two separate breweries. 

In 1864 Georg Pschorr Jr. became the owner and assumed management of the Pschorr Brewery. During nearly 21 years of uninterrupted construction, he realized his life’s goal – to build a new large brewery with the most advanced equipment. The Pschorr Brewery was then an industrial company with an annual output that will triple in the years.

In 1972, Hacker and Pschorr merged to form Hacker-Pschorr. 

In 2007, Hacker-Pschorr is the first Munich brewery to switch the bottles of its full range of beers to use traditional swing tops.

Oktoberfest

When Crown Prince Ludwig I of Bavaria was about to celebrate his wedding in Munich in 1810, he decided it was an occasion for all of Bavaria to celebrate. He commissioned Josef Pschorr, then the brewmaster of the Hacker-Pschorr brewery, among other Munich brewers, to develop special brews to commemorate the occasion.

Subsequent annual celebrations evolved into the city of Munich’s Oktoberfest, which is attended by over six million people each year, who in 2011 consumed over six million litres of beer. By Munich law, only the six breweries within the city limits of Munich are invited to serve their beer at Oktoberfest. Hacker-Pschorr is one of the six, as is its sister brand, Paulaner. Today’s event is held on land donated by Josef Pschorr.

The  Hacker-Pschorr brewery serves various tents at the Oktoberfest such as Hacker-Festzelt and Pschorr Bräurosl as well as Herzkasperl-Festzelt at the Oide Wiesn. In both first tents the beer is distributed to the bars using a modern beer ring line. In Herzkasperl-Festzelt traditional oak barrels are used.

Beers
Hacker-Pschorr produces 13 different products, some of them are only seasonally available.  Hacker-Pschorr Weisse is the company's flagship beer.

Sold in Germany
Münchner Hell
Münchener Gold
Hell Alkoholfrei
Münchner Dunkel
Münchner Radler
Natur Radler
Natur Radler Alkoholfrei
Oktoberfest Märzen
Animator: Naturtrüber Doppelbock
Kellerbier
Superior
Hefe Weisse
Stern Weisse

Sold in United States
Munich Gold (Münchener Gold)
Weisse (Hefe Weisse)
Weisse Dark (Dunkel Weisse)
Hubertus Bock
Original Oktoberfest (Oktoberfest Märzen)
Munich Dark (Münchner Dunkel)

Distribution
Prior to 2009, Hacker-Pschorr was imported to the U.S. via Star Brand Imports, based in White Plains, New York and part of  Heineken International. In 2009, Paulaner HP USA (formerly Distinguished Brands) of Littleton, Colorado, took over the import business of Hacker-Pschorr and Paulaner in the United States.

Awards and recognition
The Beer from Hacker Pschorr brewery was awarded at the 1876 World Exhibition in Philadelphia.

References

External links
 Hacker-Pschorr 
 Official U.S. Hacker-Pschorr Website
 Official U.S.Hacker-Pschorr Blog
 

1417 establishments in Europe
Beer and breweries in Bavaria
Brewery companies of Munich
Beer brands of Germany